Hindericus Scheepstra (17 March 1859 – 8 May 1913) was a Dutch writer best known for his children's book series Ot en Sien (1902).

Family and education 
Hindericus Scheepstra was born in Roden, the last of nine children. His parents were Hindrik Scheepstra en Janna Roeters.

Bibliography 
 1902 - Dicht bij Huis ("Close to home")
 1904 - Nog bij Moeder ("Still with mother")

See also
 Jan Ligthart
 Ot en Sien

References

1859 births
1913 deaths
People from Noordenveld
19th-century Dutch novelists
19th-century Dutch male writers